Rebel is an American police drama television series created by Amani Walker, starring Danielle Moné Truitt. The series premiered on BET on March 28, 2017. The series follows Oakland police officer Rebecca "Rebel" Knight, who after her brother was killed by police, began working as private investigator. In November 2017, BET cancelled the series after one season.

Rebel was picked up to series with eight episode order and a two-hour pilot on April 20, 2016, by BET. John Singleton is executive producer, writer and director.

On June 9, 2016, stage actress Danielle Moné Truitt was cast as lead character, while Giancarlo Esposito, Mykelti Williamson, Method Man, and Brandon Quinn also were cast as series regulars. On November 28, 2017, the series was cancelled after one season.

Cast

Main cast
 Danielle Moné Truitt as Rebecca "Rebel" Knight. Truitt also plays her character's mother Bernadette in flashbacks.
 Method Man as Terrance "TJ" Jenkins
 Brandon Quinn as Thompson "Mack" McIntyre
 Angela Ko as Cheena 
 Mykelti Williamson as Rene Knight
 Giancarlo Esposito as Charles Gold

Recurring characters 
 Derek Ray as Jimmy McIntyre
 Michael Masini as Vaughn Bryant 
 Jerry Kernion as Captain Frank Hart 
 Mandy June Turpin as April Sommerdale 
 West Liang as Bryan Markey 
 Mikelen Walker as Malik Knight 
 Malcolm M. Mays as Brim 
 Anthony L. Fernandez as Texas, Diego Perreira
 Adrian Anchondo as Hector 
 Anthony Corrales as Eddie Porzo 
 Patrick Labyorteaux as Dr. Adam Loyton
 Rebecca Wisocky as Elsa Folster 
 Travis Johns as Sam Halderton 
 Bree Williamson as Dolores 
 Angel Parker as Stella Parker 
 Juan Alfonso as Jorge Polanco Jr. 
 Julia Cho as Dr. Sara Chan 
 Karole Foreman as Claudine Dudley 
 Marcuis Harris as Pastor Durod 
 Katie A. Keane as Dr. Jennifer Delge 
 Tamala Jones as Jackie
 Lauren London as Kim
 Adam Karst as Ahmad Zirnoff
 Tre Hall as Two Man

Episodes

References

External links

2017 American television series debuts
2017 American television series endings
2010s American drama television series
English-language television shows
BET original programming
Television shows set in Oakland, California
2010s American black television series
American black television series